Machete is the name of a fictional character appearing in American comic books published by Marvel Comics. Also known as Ferdinand Lopez, the character has been a member of Batroc's Brigade and Doom's Brigade. He was also a former revolutionary of San Diablo in South America. He became a mercenary to finance a revolution but is reportedly killed by Zeitgeist. He first appeared in Captain America  #302.

Fictional character biography

Fernando Lopez was born in the country of San Diablo. He became a revolutionary, and later a mercenary. He joined Batroc's Brigade. He then first battled Captain America alongside Batroc's Brigade. He next battled Hawkeye alongside Batroc's Brigade, which had been hired for that purpose by Trickshot.

Later, Machete was employed by Baron Zemo with the assistance of Batroc's Brigade to steal the skeleton of Ulysses Bloodstone. Machete traveled to the Amazon Jungle with Batroc's Brigade, and was captured by Incas. Machete battled the Incas alongside Batroc's Brigade, Zemo, Captain America, and Diamondback. Machete then battled Captain America alongside Batroc's Brigade. Machete traveled to the Bermuda Triangle, where he battled Captain America again alongside Batroc's Brigade. He traveled to Egypt alongside Batroc's Brigade in search of the Bloodstone fragment. He traveled to Tokyo alongside Batroc's Brigade. There, he battled Japanese cultists for possession of another Bloodstone fragment.

Fernando's brothers, Alfonso and Mariano Lopez, have also each briefly taken on the role.

Powers and abilities

Fernando Lopez is an athletic man with no superhuman powers. He is an expert with bladed weapons and the throwing of such weapons. For instance, when he attacked Captain America with the intent of stealing his shield, Machete was able to specifically destroy the superhero's shield's internal holding straps while he was wielding it by them in combat, which made the shield much more cumbersome for Captain America to use. He has extensive knowledge of guerilla warfare tactics.

Machete wore a bulletproof Kevlar flak jacket with a variety of pockets and pouches for carrying various weapons, particularly throwing-knives. He wore custom-made combat boots with additional weapons pouches; the remainder of his costume consisted of conventional military surplus items. Machete carried a variety of specially manufactured weighted steel throwing knives, two three-foot machetes, and other items as necessary. Additionally, his costume's gloves were equipped with strong electromagnets to help him retrieve his weapons in case he was disarmed.

Other versions

House of M
In this reality, Machete is a member of Shang-Chi's Dragons criminal organization, alongside, Mantis, Zaran and Swordsman.

In other media
Machete appears in the video game Spider-Man and Captain America in Doctor Doom's Revenge (1989).

References

External links

Comics characters introduced in 1985
Fictional blade and dart throwers
Fictional knife-fighters
Fictional mercenaries in comics
Fictional swordfighters in comics
Marvel Comics supervillains